The Anderson's shrew mole (Uropsilus andersoni) is a species of mammal in the family Talpidae. It is endemic to China. Its species name "andersoni" was chosen to honor American scientific collector Malcolm Playfair Anderson.

References

Mammals of China
Uropsilus
Endemic fauna of Sichuan
Mammals described in 1911
Taxa named by Oldfield Thomas
Taxonomy articles created by Polbot